Song Chi-Hun (born 24 September 1991) is a South Korean footballer who plays as midfielder.

Career
He was selected by Bucheon FC 1995 in the 2013 K League draft.

References

External links 

1991 births
Living people
Association football midfielders
South Korean footballers
Bucheon FC 1995 players
K League 2 players
Place of birth missing (living people)
Expatriate footballers in Cambodia
South Korean expatriates in Cambodia
Nagaworld FC players